Asanovo (Äsän) is a rural locality (a selo) in Karmasansky Selsoviet, Ufimsky District, Bashkortostan, Russia. The population was 427 as of 2010. There are 3 streets.

Geography 
Asanovo is located 52 km northwest of Ufa (the district's administrative centre) by road. Karmasan is the nearest rural locality.

References 

Rural localities in Ufimsky District